William Lind Mearns (4 May 1885 – 3 June 1948) was an Australian rules footballer who played with St Kilda in the Victorian Football League (VFL).

Notes

External links 

1885 births
1948 deaths
VFL/AFL players born outside Australia
Australian rules footballers from Victoria (Australia)
St Kilda Football Club players
Port Melbourne Football Club players